Zinc finger protein 506 is a protein that in humans is encoded by the ZNF506 gene.

References

Further reading 

Human proteins